Honey Lee Cottrell (January 16, 1946 – September 21, 2015) was a lesbian photographer and filmmaker who lived most of her life in San Francisco, California. Her papers are part of the Human Sexuality Collection at Cornell University Library.

Early life and education
Cottrell was raised in Michigan, moving to San Francisco in 1968. She learned photography in her twenties and in her thirties, and went to school at San Francisco State University, earning a B.A. in film studies. She funded her early artistic work by serving as a waiter on cruise ships, earning a certificate as a merchant seaman.

Career
She began exhibiting her photography in the mid-1970s in San Francisco, becoming well known for her photography of women. She collaborated with other lesbian photographers, including Tee Corinne. In the 1976 documentary film We Are Ourselves, Cottrell and Tee Corinne describe their relationship to filmmaker Ann Hershey.

Cottrell collaborated with Joani Blank on the 1978 path-breaking book "I Am My Lover," published by Blank's Down There Press. Blank edited the book, pairing Cottrell's photographs of individual women with these women's written reflections on masturbation and on learning to give themselves pleasure. Cottrell's first film, Sweet Dreams (1979) included Pat Califia and was produced by the National Sex Forum. Sweet Dreams is described by documentary film critics as part of a tradition of the "feminist autobiographic art of masturbation demonstration".  The film also is described as ground-breaking in its combination of second-wave cultural feminism and lesbian erotica.

Through the 1980s and 1990s, Cottrell worked as contributing photographer for On Our Backs, a lesbian sex magazine edited by Susie Bright. Her work became influential in representations of lesbian sex and feminist lesbian portraiture. Along with Corinne and later, Susie Bright and other lovers and artistic collaborators, Cottrell strategically positioned sexually explicit photography as part of lesbian culture and as populist sex education.  Her lesbian s/m images in particular, in works such as the SAMOIS book Coming to Power, were considered controversially pornographic by feminist critics. She worked for Fatale Media as a consultant, a film company known for getting the first lesbian porn film into the Frameline Film Festival in 1985.

Cottrell was a co-founder of the San Francisco Lesbian and Gay History Project, working with many other artists, writers, historians and cultural critics.

Bibliography
 Blank, Joani and Honey Lee Cottrell, editors. I Am My Lover. Burlingame, CA: Down There Press, 1978.
 Sinister Wisdom #7. Lincoln, NE: Sinister Wisdom, 1978. 
 The Blatant Image: A Magazine of Feminist Photography, vol. 1, 1981. Sunny Valley, OR.
 The Blatant Image: A Magazine of Feminist Photography, vol. 2. 1982. Sunny Valley, OR.
 SAMOIS. Coming to Power. Boston: Alyson, 1981.
 On Our Backs, numerous issues. San Francisco: Blush Productions.
 Taylor, Jill with photographs by Honey Lee Cottrell. A Dyke's Bike Repair Handbook. Los Angeles: Clothespin Fever Press, 1990.
 Bright, Susie and Jill Posener, eds. Nothing But the Girl: The Blatant Lesbian Image. London and New York: Cassell, 1996.

Films
 Sweet Dreams. Director and camera. 1979.

References

External links
 Photos of and by Honey Lee Cottrell  in the Lesbian Herstory Archives, Digital Culture of Metropolitan New York.
 Photos of and by Honey Lee Cottrell in the Cornell Images from the Rare and Manuscript Collections, Shared Shelf Commons.
 Honey Lee Cottrell's personal papers and photo archive are available at Cornell University's Human Sexuality Collection.

1946 births
2015 deaths
Feminist artists
Lesbian feminists
American LGBT photographers
Photographers from California
San Francisco State University alumni
20th-century American photographers
21st-century American photographers
LGBT people from Oregon
LGBT people from Michigan
20th-century American women photographers
21st-century American women photographers
Lesbian photographers
American lesbian artists